Tania Maree Maxwell is a former Australian politician. She was a Derryn Hinch's Justice Party member of the Victorian Legislative Council between 2018 and 2022, representing Northern Victoria Region. She was not re-elected at the 2022 state election.

Maxwell was born and raised in Finley, New South Wales, before moving to Perth to work in Western Australia's mining sector in 1988. She then moved to Wangaratta, Victoria, where she became a youth worker and studied mental health.

In 2016, maXWELL and co-founded a community-led campaign called #ENOUGHISENOUGH!, following the murder of schoolgirl Zoe Buttigieg in 2015.

Maxwell in 2020 successfully put a motion in Victoria's Parliament to establish an inquiry into Victoria's criminal justice system by the Legislative Council Legal and Social Issues Committee, of which she had been a member since 2019. The inquiry's first hearing was held in Wangaratta. The committee reported on March 24, 2021, making 100 recommendations to reform the state's criminal justice system.

Maxwell is married to Jarrod Toomer.

References

Year of birth missing (living people)
Living people
Derryn Hinch's Justice Party members of the Parliament of Victoria
Members of the Victorian Legislative Council
Women members of the Victorian Legislative Council
21st-century Australian politicians
21st-century Australian women politicians